Kaylyn Susan Hansen (born August 14, 1999) is an American mixed martial artist (MMA) who competes in the strawweight division of Invicta Fighting Championships  She also formerly fought in Ultimate Fighting Championship (UFC).

Background 
Hansen grew up with a single mom and three younger sisters until the age of seven when her parents reunited. At the age of 16, her parents separated and Kay stayed with her father despite the "manipulating and toxic environment" he upheld since her childhood.

Hansen originally played softball, but after seeing Ronda Rousey defeat Bethe Correia at UFC 190, she decided she would rather train in MMA. She trained under Erik Paulson at Combat Submission Wrestling (CSW), competing in Pankration Youth Fights for an undefeated record of 4–0: two armbars, one Americana, and one unanimous decision.

Mixed martial arts career

Amateur career 
Hansen made her amateur debut in September 2017, less than a month and a half after her 18th birthday. The fight took place under Fight Club OC at their Gladiator MMA Championship Series 3. She fought Cecilia Padilla in the flyweight division and won via technical knockout in the first round.

Invicta Fighting Championships 
Hansen made her professional debut as a strawweight at Invicta FC 26: Maia vs. Niedzwiedz. She defeated opponent Emilee Prince within the first two minutes of round one via armbar, making her the youngest fighter to win a fight in IFC history.

Hansen faced Kalyn Schwartz at Invicta FC 28: Mizuki vs. Jandiroba. After receiving an elbow to the temple that caused a bloody cut, she lost the fight via technical knockout in the second round. Hansen's next fight was for California Cage Warriors where she defeated Gabby Romero by third-round TKO.

Hansen returned to Invicta at Invicta FC 31: Jandiroba vs. Morandin in September 2018 with an impressive third-round TKO victory over Helen Peralta. After the bout, Hansen called out undefeated flyweight prospect Erin Blanchfield. Hansen would get that fight at the very next event, Invicta FC 32: Spencer vs. Sorenson, serving as a late replacement for Luanna Alzuguir and moving up to flyweight. Hansen lost to Blanchfield via majority decision.

Hansen bounced back at Invicta FC 33: Frey vs. Grusander II in December 2018, returning to strawweight and defeated Sharon Jacobson via third round submission. Hansen had taken the fight against Jacobson on one week's notice, replacing Kanako Murata. In May 2019, Hansen lost a split decision to Magdaléna Šormová at Invicta FC Phoenix Series 1. In October, Hansen defeated Nicole Caliari via third round submission at Invicta FC 37: Gonzalez vs. Sanchez.

Ultimate Fighting Championship
Hansen made her UFC debut on June 27, 2020, against Jinh Yu Frey at UFC on ESPN: Poirier vs. Hooker. She won the fight via a submission in round three. This win earned her the Performance of the Night  award.

Hansen faced promotional newcomer Cory McKenna on November 14, 2020, at UFC Fight Night: Felder vs. dos Anjos. She lost the fight via unanimous decision.

Hansen was scheduled to face promotional newcomer Cheyanne Vlismas on March 20, 2021, at UFC on ESPN 21. However, Hansen pulled out due to undisclosed reasons and was replaced on March 12 by promotional newcomer Montserrat Ruiz. Later Hansen publicly opened about struggling with eating disorder which led to the withdrawal and time off from the sport.

Hansen was scheduled to face Jasmine Jasudavicius on January 15, 2022, at UFC on ESPN 32. However, the pair was moved to UFC 270 on January 22, 2022, for undisclosed reasons.  Hansen lost the fight via unanimous decision.

Hansen faced Piera Rodríguez on April 9, 2022 at UFC 273. At the weigh-ins, Hansen weighed in at 118.5 pounds, 2.5 pounds over the strawweight non-title fight limit. The bout proceeded at a catchweight and she forfeited 20% of her purse which went to Rodríguez. She lost the fight via unanimous decision.

Hansen was released by the UFC in mid April 2022.

Return to Invicta Fighting Championships 
On April 29, 2022, it was announced that Hansen had signed a multi-fight contract with Invicta FC.

Championships and accomplishments
Ultimate Fighting Championship
 Performance of the Night (One time) 
Invicta Fighting Championships
Performance of the Night (one time) 
Fight of the Night (one time)

Mixed martial arts record

|-
|Loss
|align=center|7–6
|Piera Rodríguez
|Decision (unanimous)
|UFC 273
|
|align=center|3
|align=center|5:00
|Jacksonville, Florida, United States
|
|-
|Loss
|align=center|7–5
|Jasmine Jasudavicius
|Decision (unanimous)
|UFC 270
|
|align=center|3
|align=center|5:00
|Anaheim, California, United States
|
|-
|Loss
|align=center|7–4
|Cory McKenna
|Decision (unanimous)
|UFC Fight Night: Felder vs. dos Anjos
|
|align=center|3
|align=center|5:00
|Las Vegas, Nevada, United States
|
|-
|Win
|align=center|7–3
|Jinh Yu Frey
|Submission (armbar)
|UFC on ESPN: Poirier vs. Hooker
|
|align=center|3
|align=center|2:26
|Las Vegas, Nevada, United States
|
|-
|Win
|align=center|6–3
|Liana Pirosin
|Decision (unanimous)
|Invicta FC Phoenix Series 3
|
|align=center|3
|align=center|5:00
|Kansas City, Kansas, United States
|
|-
|Win
|align=center|5–3
|Nicole Caliari
|Submission (guillotine choke)
|Invicta FC 37: Gonzalez vs. Sanchez
|
|align=center|3
|align=center|1:14
|Kansas City, Kansas, United States
|
|-
|Loss
|align=center|4–3
|Magdaléna Šormová
|Decision (split)
|Invicta FC Phoenix Series 1
|
|align=center|3
|align=center|5:00
|Kansas City, Kansas, United States
|
|-
|Win
|align=center|4–2
|Sharon Jacobson
|Submission (armbar)
|Invicta FC 33: Frey vs. Grusander II
|
|align=center|3
|align=center|4:43
|Kansas City, Missouri, United States
|
|-
|Loss
|align=center|3–2
|Erin Blanchfield
|Decision (majority)
|Invicta FC 32: Spencer vs. Sorenson
|
|align=center|3
|align=center|5:00
|Shawnee, Oklahoma, United States
|
|-
|Win
|align=center|3–1
|Helen Peralta
|TKO (elbows)
|Invicta FC 31: Jandiroba vs. Morandin
|
|align=center|3
|align=center|4:16
|Kansas City, Missouri, United States
|
|-
|Win
|align=center|2–1
|Gabby Romero
|TKO (punches)
|CCW 7: Super Show
|
|align=center|3
|align=center|2:00
|Campo, California, United States
|
|-
|Loss
|align=center|1–1
|Kalyn Schwartz
|TKO (punches)
|Invicta FC 28: Mizuki vs. Jandiroba
|
|align=center|2
|align=center|4:27
|Salt Lake City, Utah, United States
|
|-
|Win
|align=center|1–0
|Emilee Prince
|Submission (armbar)
|Invicta FC 26: Maia vs. Niedzwiedz
|
|align=center|1
|align=center|1:23
|Kansas City, Missouri, United States
|

|-
|Win
|align=center|1–0
|Carolina Jimenez
|Decision (unanimous)
|Invicta Phoenix Series 2
|
|align=center|1
|align=center|5:00
|Kansas City, Kansas, United States
|
|-

Amateur record

|Win
|align=center|1–0
|Cecilia Pedilla
|TKO (punches)
|Gladiator MMA Championship Series 3
||
|align=center|1
|align=center|1:43
|Los Angeles, California, United States
|
|}

Professional boxing record

{|class="wikitable" style="text-align:center; font-size:95%"
|-
!
!Result
!Record
!Opponent
!Type
!Round, time
!Date
!Location
!Notes
|-
|5
|Loss
|1–4
|style="text-align:left;"| Shurretta Metcalf
|UD
|4, 2:00
|Mar 15, 2019
|style="text-align:left;"| Southern Junction Nightclub, Irving, Texas
|style="text-align:left;"|
|-
|4
|Loss
|1–3
|style="text-align:left;"| Jessica Juarez
|MD
|4, 2:00
|Jan 31, 2019
|style="text-align:left;"| Viejas Casino & Resort, Alpine, California
|style="text-align:left;"|
|-
|3
|Win
|1–2
|style="text-align:left;"| Veronica Torres
|UD
|4, 2:00
|Jul 20, 2018
|style="text-align:left;"| San Joaquin County Fairgrounds, Stockton, California
|style="text-align:left;"|
|-

|2
|Loss
|0–2
|style="text-align:left;"| Marcia Agripino
|MD
|4, 2:00
|Jun 2, 2018
|style="text-align:left;"| Foxwoods Resort, Mashantucket, Connecticut
|style="text-align:left;"|
|-
|1
|Loss
|0–1
|style="text-align:left;"| Aida Satybaldinova
|UD
|4, 2:00
|Apr 18, 2018
|style="text-align:left;"| Westin Bonaventura Hotel, Los Angeles, California
|style="text-align:left;"|
|-

See also
 List of current Invicta FC fighters
 List of female mixed martial artists

References

External links
 
 

1999 births
Living people
American female mixed martial artists
Mixed martial artists from California
Strawweight mixed martial artists
Mixed martial artists utilizing boxing
Mixed martial artists utilizing Brazilian jiu-jitsu
Ultimate Fighting Championship female fighters
American women boxers
Boxers from California
American practitioners of Brazilian jiu-jitsu
Female Brazilian jiu-jitsu practitioners
21st-century American women